Wakanda Forever may refer to:

Black Panther: Wakanda Forever, a 2022 sequel to the film Black Panther
 "Wakanda Forever", a catchphrase associated with the fictional country in Marvel Comics of Wakanda